Adventures of a Rookie is a 1943 comedy film directed by Leslie Goodwins. It was the debut of RKO's comedy duo Carney and Brown. A sequel, Rookies in Burma, followed.

Plot
Three young men from completely different levels of society get their draft notices the same day. Jerry Miles works as an MC on a nightclub, Mike Strager drives a truck for a living and Bob Prescott is the heir of a wealthy family. The three men all report for military duty, and are measured to get uniforms as well as tested for aptitude. Bob scores somewhat higher than the other two and is assigned to be in charge of the men during the bus drive to boot camp. Bob’s uniform is all covered in mud, splashing up from a passing car, driven by the cute Peggy Linden.

Jerry and the slow-witted Mike manage to get pushed off the bus and are left behind. When the rest of the group finally arrive at the camp, Bob sees his hopes of entering officer training school vanish when he meets the colonel, who is Bob’s commanding officer as well as uncle. The colonel gives Bob a scolding for the loss of two men on the ride there and for wearing a dirty uniform.

Nonetheless, the three recruits are soon granted a six-hour pass, and are invited by Peggy to join her and five of her girl friends for a turkey dinner at the Linden house. The evening passes without mishaps, until Bob is about to return to the base, when Dr. Potts arrives. The doctor has been called upon on account of Hilda, the Lindens' cook. The doctor diagnoses Hilda with a case of scarlet fever, and the doctor goes on to quarantine the house for two whole weeks.

Bob calls the base to report the news. Sgt. Burke, who is his platoon leader, arrives to the house to investigate, and when he thoughtlessly enters he is quarantined with the rest of the men. However, Burke is determined not to let a quarantine interfere with the training of his men, so he leads exercises with his men in maneuvers up and down the stairs and throughout the house.

A few days later the doctor returns to the Linden house to examine Hilda again. He announces that he has misdiagnosed her and lifts the quarantine. The recruits can go back to the base, but when they arrive back to the camp they are immediately sent out on a harsh thirty-day field exercise. Burke orders Bob, Mike and Jerry to march away twelve miles to their field base. The three men decide to save some time by hitching a ride with a convoy. They are however totally unaware that the convoy they hike with is actually bound for San Francisco. They fall asleep and are in for quite a surprise as they wake up, and are ordered to join the troops being shipped overseas to take part in the war.

The men soon find themselves AWOL on an ocean-bound freight boat. They put their heads together once more, and decide on using the ship's cargo nets to swing back to the docks before the ship leaves the harbor. The net jams, and they fall into the water.  Luckily enough they find themselves being of some use, as they get to pick up a whole briefcase of dispatches that somehow had fallen overboard.

The three men are considered heroes for saving the dispatches, but after the swim they’re hospitalized. Lying in the hospital the receive news that none other than General Ames is coming to personally thank them. They do realize that if the general discovers they are AWOL, Bob will never be admitted to officer training school. To avoid this Bob insists that they sneak out of the hospital before the general arrives. The nurses see them trying to escape, and call for the M.P.'s. The three men are caught and sent back to their unit at the camp.

To hide the fact that they are AWOL, Jerry suggests they should say that they were lost on their march to the field camp. They get help from Peggy, who drives them to a deserted ravine, where they are found by Burke and taken to the colonel. Burke tells the colonel that he saw Peggy drop the three men off at the ravine, the colonel orders the trio jailed. When their company prepares to ship out, Jerry and Mike are released and commanded to follow Burke. The colonel gets a letter written by General Ames, where the men’s heroics are explained. The colonel forgives Bob, who then abandons his pursuit of officer training school to join his friends, as they are being shipped overseas to the war.

Cast
 Wally Brown as Jerry Miles
 Alan Carney as Mike Strager
 Richard Martin as Bob Prescott
 Erford Gage as Sgt. Burke
 Margaret Landry as Peggy Linden
 Patti Brill as Patsy
 Rita Corday as Ruth
 Robert Andersen as Sgt Wilson
 John Hamilton as Colonel Wilson
 Jack Baron as Colonel
 Ruth Lee as Mrs. Linden
 Lorraine Krueger as Eve
 Henry Roquemore as Dr. Potts
 Stanley Andrews as General Ames

Reception
The film made a profit of $198,000.

References

External list
 Adventures of a Rookie at IMDb
 
 
 

1943 films
1943 comedy films
RKO Pictures films
Films produced by Bert Gilroy
Films directed by Leslie Goodwins
American black-and-white films
American comedy films
Military humor in film
World War II films made in wartime